Karen Gennadyevich Oganyan (born 25 June 1982) is a former Russian professional footballer of Armenian ethnic origin.

Career
Oganyan made his debut in the Russian Premier League in 2001 for FC Torpedo Moscow. He has also played in the Premier League with FC Torpedo-Metallurg Moscow and FC Alania Vladikavkaz. Oganyan made four appearances for FC Metalist Kharkiv in the Ukrainian Premier League.

References

1982 births
Footballers from Moscow
Living people
Russian people of Armenian descent
Russian footballers
FC Torpedo Moscow players
FC Torpedo-2 players
FC Moscow players
FC Spartak Vladikavkaz players
FC Metalist Kharkiv players
FC KAMAZ Naberezhnye Chelny players
FC Zvezda Irkutsk players
Russian expatriate footballers
Expatriate footballers in Ukraine
Russian Premier League players
Ukrainian Premier League players
FC Volgar Astrakhan players
FC Luch Vladivostok players
Expatriate footballers in Latvia
Association football forwards